Coelorinchus sheni is a species of rattail. It is only known from depths of 450–650 m off the coast of Taiwan.

This is a fairly large rattail with the limited number of known specimens including one over 93 cm in length. It has a large eye, a long, blunt-ended snout and a large-opening mouth. There is a series of dark saddle-shaped marks along the body and a small light-producing organ.

References

Macrouridae
Fish described in 2004
Fish of the Pacific Ocean
Fish of Taiwan
Endemic fauna of Taiwan